Āśān is a Malayalam and Tamil surname and title that means teacher or guide.

Etymology
Aasaan is a simplification of the Sanskrit term "Acharya" to denote "teacher/guru".

Traditions
They acted as the media for Sanskritisation and literacy to Non-Brahmins.  Ezhuthuassan was another name in which they were known at certain  regions of Kerala. Till the second half of twentieth century the AsanKalari  or Ezhuthu Kalari  or Ezhuthu palli (village schools) were  common in each village as it was conducted in many families of Ganaka in Travancore.

The female members of Ganaka were generally addressed as Asatti or Asaatti,  because they too had engaged in teaching 3Rs to pupil. 

For the last  two centuries, it has not been uncommon to adopt this title by  many learned people from  other castes (Nair, Ezhava, Thiyya, Christian Nadar) as well. Eventually, the common usage of the term Asan gradually lost its original meaning as a  venerated symbolic representation for teachers, as it is found used in every parlance without any significance to its meaning.

Notable persons
  Kumaran Asan, one of the triumvirate poets of modern Kerala

References

External links

Titles in India
Kerala society
Buddhist titles
Titles and occupations in Hinduism
 
History of education in India